During World War I, the importance of military control of the air became evident. The United Kingdom government therefore sought to significantly increase aircraft manufacturing capacity. In 1917 the Ministry of Munitions, then headed by Winston Churchill, commissioned the construction of National Aircraft Factories to significantly boost the rate and scale of production.

Four factories were commissioned 

 National Aircraft Factory No. 1 at Waddon in Croydon, producing de Havilland DH.9
 National Aircraft Factory No. 2 at Heaton Chapel, Stockport, managed by Crossley Motors and producing de Havilland DH.9
 National Aircraft Factory No. 3 at Aintree, Liverpool, operated by Cunard to produce Bristol F.2 Fighters
 Ham near Kingston upon Thames, Surrey – leased and operated by Sopwith Aviation and producing Snipe, Dolphin and Salamander fighter planes. This, confusingly, was also referred to as National Aircraft Factory No. 2

References

Defunct aircraft manufacturers of the United Kingdom